Jasmine Felicia Crockett (born March 29, 1981) is an American attorney and politician serving as the U.S. representative for Texas's 30th congressional district since 2023. Her district covers most of South Dallas County and parts of Tarrant County, including Dallas Love Field Airport. A member of the Democratic Party, she previously represented the 100th district in the Texas House of Representatives. 

In the 118th Congress, Crockett serves as the Democratic freshman class representative between the House Democratic leadership and the approximately 35 newly elected Democratic members.

Early life and career 
Crockett was born in St. Louis, Missouri. She earned a Bachelor of Arts in business from Rhodes College. As an undergraduate, Crockett planned to become an anesthesiologist or Certified Public Accountant before deciding to attend law school. She earned a Juris Doctor from the University of Houston Law Center.

After law school, Crockett remained in Texas and worked as a civil rights attorney. She worked as a public defender for Bowie County before establishing her own law firm. During the George Floyd protests, Crockett and her associates took on the pro bono cases of several Black Lives Matter activists.

Texas House of Representatives
In 2019, after Eric Johnson vacated his seat in the Texas House to serve as mayor of Dallas, a special election was held on November 5 for the remainder of his term, which Lorraine Birabil won. Crockett announced that she would challenge Birabil in the 2020 Democratic primary. She narrowly defeated Birabil in a primary runoff, advancing to the November 2020 general election, which she won unopposed. She assumed office in January 2021.

U.S. House of Representatives

Elections

2022 

On November 20, 2021, incumbent U.S. Representative Eddie Bernice Johnson of Texas's 30th congressional district announced she would not seek reelection in 2022. Four days later, Crockett declared her candidacy for the seat. Johnson simultaneously announced that she was backing Crockett. Crockett also received extensive financial support from Super PACs aligned with the cryptocurrency industry, with Sam Bankman-Fried's Protect Our Future PAC giving $1 million in support of her campaign. In the Democratic primary election, Crockett and Jane Hope Hamilton, an aide to Marc Veasey, advanced to a runoff election, which Crockett won. She then won the general election on November 8. Crockett was chosen to be the 118th Congress's freshman class representative.

Caucus memberships 

Congressional Black Caucus
Congressional Equality Caucus
Congressional Progressive Caucus

Committee assignments 

 Committee on Agriculture
 Committee on Oversight

Electoral history

References

External links 

 Congresswoman Jasmine Crockett official U.S. House website
 Jasmine Crockett for Congress campaign website
 

|-

|-

1981 births
21st-century African-American politicians
21st-century American politicians
21st-century American women politicians
African-American members of the United States House of Representatives
African-American women in politics
Democratic Party members of the Texas House of Representatives
Democratic Party members of the United States House of Representatives from Texas
Female members of the United States House of Representatives
Living people
Politicians from St. Louis
Public defenders
Rhodes College alumni
Texas lawyers
University of Houston Law Center alumni
Women state legislators in Texas